Helge Gaarder (25 November 1953 – 15 April 2004) was a Norwegian singer, composer, journalist and producer.

Gaarder was born in Oslo to children's writer Inger Margrethe Gaarder, and was a brother of Jostein Gaarder. He was a member of various musical groups, including the anarchist band Geitost, the punk band , the experimental band Montasje, and the rock band . In 1984 he issued the solo album Eine keine Angst Musik. Gaarder was also journalist for the music magazine , was part of the project Forente Artister, and worked as producer for Concerts Norway.

References

Musicians from Oslo
1953 births
2004 deaths
Journalists from Oslo
20th-century Norwegian journalists